Ronnie MacAskill (born 25 April 1954) is a Scottish professional golfer and director of golf. He was born in Alness, Ross-shire, Scotland and moved to Aberdeen in 1971. In 1975, he became head PGA Professional at Royal Aberdeen Golf Club, and as of 2017 is the longest serving professional in Scotland. Now full-time PGA Director of Golf, he will have been at the club for 40 years in 2015.

He also runs Fettes Fine Art in Edinburgh, specialising in fine British art. He owns property businesses in Edinburgh and London.

References

Scottish male golfers
Golf administrators
1954 births
Living people